Two ships of the Royal Navy have been named HMS Nigella :

  an  sloop launched in 1915 and sold in 1922
  a  launched in 1940 and sold in 1947 for mercantile service as Nigelock. She sank in 1955

Royal Navy ship names